The University of Cincinnati (UC or Cincinnati) is a public research university in Cincinnati, Ohio. Founded in 1819 as Cincinnati College, it is the oldest institution of higher education in Cincinnati and has an annual enrollment of over 44,000 students, making it the second largest university in Ohio. It is part of the University System of Ohio. The university has four major campuses, with Cincinnati's main uptown campus and medical campus in the Heights and Corryville neighborhoods, and branch campuses in Batavia and Blue Ash, Ohio.

The university has 14 constituent colleges, with programs in architecture, business, education, engineering, humanities, the sciences, law, music, and medicine. The medical college includes a leading teaching hospital and several biomedical research laboratories, with developments made including a live polio vaccine and diphenhydramine. UC was also the first university to implement a co-operative education (co-op) model.

The university is accredited by the Higher Learning Commission and is classified as "R1: Doctoral Universities – Very high research activity". According to the National Science Foundation, UC spent $480 million on research and development in 2018, ranking it 54th in the nation.

UC's athletic teams are called the Cincinnati Bearcats and compete in the National Collegiate Athletic Association Division I as a member of the American Athletic Conference, although the university is switching to the Big 12 Conference in 2023.

History

Early history

In 1819, Cincinnati College and the Medical College of Ohio were founded in Cincinnati. Local benefactor Dr. Daniel Drake
founded and funded the Medical College of Ohio. William Lytle of the Lytle family donated the land, funded the Cincinnati College and Law College, and served as its first president. The college survived only six years before financial difficulties forced it to close. In 1835, Daniel Drake reestablished the institution, which eventually joined with the Cincinnati Law School.

In 1858, Charles McMicken died of pneumonia and in his will he allocated most of his estate to the City of Cincinnati to found a university. The University of Cincinnati was chartered by the Ohio legislature in 1870  after delays by livestock and veal lobbyists angered by the liberal arts-centered curriculum and lack of agricultural and manufacturing emphasis. The university's board of rectors changed the institution's name to the University of Cincinnati.

Expansion and 20th century

By 1893, the university expanded beyond its primary location on Clifton Avenue and relocated to its present location in the Heights neighborhood. As the university expanded, the rectors merged the institution with Cincinnati Law School, establishing the University of Cincinnati College of Law. In 1896, the Ohio Medical College joined Miami Medical College to form the Ohio-Miami Medical Department of the University of Cincinnati in 1909. As political movements for temperance and suffrage grew, the university established Teacher's College in 1905 and a Graduate School in the College of Arts and Sciences in 1906. The  Queen City College of Pharmacy, acquired from Wilmington College (Ohio), became the present James L. Winkle College of Pharmacy.

In 1962, the Cincinnati College-Conservatory of Music was acquired by the university. The Ohio legislature in Columbus declared the university a "municipally-sponsored, state-affiliated" institution in 1968. During this time, the University of Cincinnati was the second oldest and second-largest municipal university in the United States.

Modern history
By an act of the Ohio Legislature, the University of Cincinnati became a state institution in 1977.

In 1989, President Joseph A. Steger released a Master Plan for a stronger academy. Over this time, the university invested nearly $2 billion in campus construction, renovation, and expansion ranging from the student union to a new recreation center to the medical school. It included renovation and construction of multiple buildings, a campus forest, and a university promenade. The plan also includes the Sigma Sigma Commons, which was completed in 1998 as a part of the organization's centennial.

Upon her inauguration in 2005, President Nancy L. Zimpher developed the UC21 plan, designed to redefine Cincinnati as a leading urban research university. In addition, it includes putting liberal arts education at the center, increasing research funding, and expanding involvement in the city.

In 2009, Gregory H. Williams was named the 27th president of the University of Cincinnati. His presidency expanded the accreditation and property of the institution to regions throughout Ohio to compete with private and specialized state institutions, such as Ohio State University. His administration focused on maintaining the integrity and holdings of the university.  He focused on the academic master plan for the university, placing the academic programs of UC at the core of the strategic plan. The university invested in scholarships, funding for study abroad experiences, the university's advising program as it worked to reaffirm its history and academy for the future.  Neville Pinto is the current and 30th president of the university.

Campuses

Uptown campus

The Uptown campus includes the West, Medical, and Victory Parkway campuses.

West Campus 
The university moved to this location in 1893. Most of the undergraduate colleges at the university are located on main campus. The exceptions are part of the University of Cincinnati Academic Health Center on the Medical campus. In spring of 2010 the University of Cincinnati was honored by being one of only 13 colleges and universities named by Forbes as one of "The World's Most Beautiful College Campuses".

The Japanese Language School of Greater Cincinnati, a supplementary school for Japanese citizens, moved to UC in 1984, and was held in fourteen rooms at Swift Hall. It was scheduled to move to the Northern Kentucky University (NKU) on July 1, 1993.

Medical Campus 

It is catty corner to West campus on Martin Luther King Jr. Blvd. The undergraduate colleges of Allied Health Sciences and Nursing and graduate colleges of Medicine and the James L. Winkle College of Pharmacy are located there. The hospitals located there include University of Cincinnati Medical Center, Cincinnati Children's Hospital Medical Center, Cincinnati VA Medical Center, and the Shriners Hospital for Children.

Victory Parkway Campus 
This campus was formally home to the College of Applied Science. When it merged with the College of Engineering to become the College of Engineering and Applied Science many of the classes were moved to the main campus, but limited courses are still taught there. There is a shuttle that runs between this and main campus throughout the day.

Regional campuses

 Blue Ash College (UCBA) (regional campus, located in Blue Ash, Ohio). Formerly known as Raymond Walters College.
 Clermont College (CLER) (regional campus, located in Batavia, Ohio); includes UC East (located in a renovated Ford plant in Batavia, OH, this facility serves as expansion space for Clermont College and select programs in the College of Nursing and the College of Education, Criminal Justice, and Human Services, as well as the BTAS in Applied Administration program.)

UC Online 
UC Online offers over 80 graduate, undergraduate and certificate programs through an online distance education platform.

Off-campus facilities
Center Hill Research Facility
UC Reading Campus & UC Metabolic Diseases Institute
Cincinnati Center for Field Studies
Cincinnati Observatory (university owns the facility and the nonprofit Cincinnati Observatory Center operates it)
1819 Building

Architecture

The university has had a strategic plan for the last decade for new architecture to be built by "signature architects." In recent years, the university has received attention from architects and campus planners as one of the most beautiful in the world.

Sustainability

In autumn of 2010, the University of Cincinnati maintained its position in green and sustainability initiatives by being named one of only 286 "Green Colleges" by The Princeton Review. The university has received this distinction each year since. UC was the only public university in Ohio and the only university in the Southern Ohio region included on this list. Some of the programs that helped achieve this distinction include: a bike share program where UC students can rent bikes from the university, an expanded recycling program, improved and expanded campus transportation options, the addition of vehicle charging stations, fuel pellet use in place of coal, greatly decreased energy and water use throughout campus, and the addition of 6 Leadership in Energy and Environmental Design (LEED) certified buildings since 2005. In 2007, former university president Nancy Zimpher signed the American College & University Presidents' Climate Commitment, which confirms the university's dedication to reducing its environmental impact and take the necessary steps to become climate neutral.

In 2010, UC opened up a privately funded athletic practice facility and women's lacrosse stadium named Sheakley Athletic Complex. As a continued effort to go green, a chilled water thermal energy storage tank was placed under the fields and at night water is chilled and then used to air-condition buildings on campus. The storage tank helps the university reach annual energy savings of about $1 million. In the fall of 2010, the university began placing "All Recycling" containers throughout campus. This expansion of recycling efforts and receptacles provides a greater opportunity for students, staff, and visitors to participate in recycling a broader range of materials. In 2010, UC recycled just over 4,600 tons of material, which was a 23 percent increase over the previous year.

Academics

Rankings

In the 2021 U.S. News & World Report rankings, UC was listed as the 196th best global university, tied for 143rd ranked U.S. national university, and tied for 65th best public university (U.S.).

Colleges and schools
The university is divided into 14 colleges and schools:

 The College of Allied Health Sciences (CAHS). The School of Social Work is within the college.
 The University of Cincinnati College of Arts and Sciences (A&S), the largest college, has 21 departments, eight co-op programs, and several interdisciplinary programs. 
 The Carl H. Lindner College of Business (LCB) is the university's business school. 
 The College-Conservatory of Music (CCM) is the university's performing arts school.
 The College of Design, Architecture, Art, and Planning (DAAP).
 College of Education, Criminal Justice, and Human Services (CECH)
 The College of Engineering and Applied Science (CEAS). The College of Applied Science (CAS) and the College of Engineering merged to form this new college in 2009. Winston Koch invented the first electronic organ at the College of Engineering. The CAS was initially organized as the Ohio Mechanics Institute (OMI) in 1828; it merged with UC in 1969 and was renamed the OMI College of Applied Science in 1979. 
 The Graduate School, a collaborative unit of all the university's colleges responsible for providing centralized administrative services for all postgraduate programs.
 The College of Law is the university's law school; it is the alma mater of William Howard Taft, who also served as the college's dean when it integrated with the University of Cincinnati in 1896. A statue of the former president stands near the campus law building.
 The College of Medicine is the university's medical school; it includes a leading teaching hospital and several biomedical research laboratories. In the 1950s Albert Sabin developed the live polio vaccine at the College of Medicine. Diphenhydramine (Benadryl) was developed here by George Rieveschl in 1946. UC also established the first emergency medicine residency program. In 2008, it became the first medical college in the country to implement the multiple mini interview system for its admission process. 
 The College of Nursing was founded in 1889. 
 The James L. Winkle College of Pharmacy was founded in 1850.

The university has two regional campuses: Clermont College (CLER) and Blue Ash College (UCBA) in Blue Ash, Ohio.

UC is also the home of the Institute for Policy Research, a multidisciplinary research organization which opened in 1971. The center performs a variety of surveys and polls on public opinion throughout Ohio, Kentucky, and Indiana, primarily through telephone surveys.

Co-operative education
The University of Cincinnati is the originator of the co-operative education (Co-Op) model. The concept was invented at UC in 1906 by Herman Schneider, Dean of the College of Engineering at the time. The program generally consists of alternating semesters of coursework on campus and outside work at a host firm, giving students over one year of relevant work experience by the time they graduate. All programs in the College of Engineering and Applied Science, Architecture programs, all design programs in the College of Design, Architecture, Art, and Planning, and Information Technology in the College of Education, Criminal Justice, and Human Services, require co-operative education experience to graduate.

University Honors Program
Each year UC welcomes roughly 375 students, or usually the top 5%-8% of students, to the University Honors Program. Students admitted into the Honors program typically meet the following qualifications: an ACT composite score of 32 or higher, an SAT score of 1400 or higher (critical reading and math combined), and either an unweighted high school GPA of 3.6 or a weighted high school GPA of 3.8.

The program is centered around students taking part in "experiences." Experiences are defined as "fall[ing] within one of five competencies: community engagement, creativity, global studies, leadership, and research." Experiences could take the form of Honors Seminars, which are certain three credit-hour courses, Pre-Approved Experiences, which consist of programs the Honors Program has already deemed to meet the requirements of an experience, and Self-Designed Experiences, where students design their own experience plan to submit to the Honors Program for approval. Students are required to complete at least five experiences before graduation.

Research
The university is classified among "R1: Doctoral Universities – Very high research activity". According to the National Science Foundation, UC spent $480 million on research and development in 2018, ranking it 54th in the nation.

Libraries

The University of Cincinnati has 14 libraries, which are housed in 11 different facilities. This also includes the Digital Projects Department. The university library system has holdings of over 4 million volumes and 70,000 periodicals. The average circulation is around 451,815 items and 116,532 reference transactions. The University of Cincinnati is a member of the Association of Research Libraries and the OhioLINK consortium of libraries.

Walter C. Langsam Library (main library)
 Donald C. Harrison Health Sciences Library (formerly AIT&L)
 Archives and Rare Books Library
 Business & Economics Library (Langsam)
 Ralph E. Oesper Chemistry-Biology Library
 John Miller Burnam Classical Library
 Albino Gorno Memorial Music (CCM) Library
 Robert A. Deshon and Karl J. Schlachter Library for Design, Architecture, Art, and Planning (DAAP)
 College of Education, Criminal Justice, and Human Services
 College of Engineering and Applied Science (CEAS) Library
 Geology-Mathematics-Physics Library
 Robert S. Marx Law Library
 Henry R. Winkler Center for the History of the Health Professions
 Clermont College Library
 Blue Ash College Library

Student life

Housing

6,500 students live on campus in ten residence halls that offer both traditional and suite style options. Students also have the option to live in themed housing, which include honors, business, and STEM-specific floors. In the fall of 2012, Campus Recreation Center Housing (CRC) was named on The Fiscal Times list of "10 Public Colleges with Insanely Luxurious Dorms". Nearly 80% of Uptown Campus incoming freshman students live on campus their first year.

In recent years, record freshman classes and increased interest by upperclass students has led to higher demand than supply for on-campus residence halls. To meet this demand, UC Housing and Food Services has added residence halls (Morgens Hall in 2013) and purchased block leases at University Park Apartments, Campus Park Apartments (formerly Sterling Manor), University Edge Apartments, and Stetson Square Apartments near campus. This has pushed the "on-campus" housing student population higher. UC's largest residence hall, Calhoun, is closed for renovations during the 2021–2022 academic year.
UC Housing & Food Services manages ten undergraduate residence halls:

 Calhoun Hall
 Campus Recreation Center Housing (CRC is only available to students who are sophomores or older)
 Dabney Hall
 Daniels Hall
 Siddall Hall
 Jefferson Complex
 Consists of Schneider Hall and Turner Hall (JCSH, JSTH).
 Stratford Heights (as of summer 2009)
 Morgens Hall
 Scioto Hall
 Marian Spencer Hall
The university also offers limited housing to graduate students. Bellevue Gardens is an apartment community owned and operated by the university. It is located close to the Academic Health Center (AHC) and medical campus. Two off-campus university-affiliated (but not university-managed) housing options were introduced in 2005: Stratford Heights and University Park Apartments. All leases in the Stratford Heights housing area have been terminated, and control of the housing complex reverted to University control as a residence hall in the summer of 2009.

Programs

The Center for First-Year Experience provides leadership for each student's first-year experience and related academic program. The center serves as a resource for all the university's undergraduate colleges and programs. The program is a collaboration between UC colleges, academic programs, and student groups and is designed to help freshmen with the transition from high school to college.

Learning communities are groups of about 20-25 students as well as faculty. Students take two classes together throughout their first year on campus, based on their major or area of study. There are nearly 120 learning communities to choose from. They are offered in the following colleges: College of Allied Health Sciences, College of Business, College of Education, Criminal Justice, and Human Services, College of Engineering & Applied Sciences, College of Nursing, and the College of Arts & Sciences. A few majors require freshmen to be in these learning communities. Many of these groups have specialized courses taught by their academic advisor.

The Transition and Access Program, which does not lead to a degree, allows certain disabled adults to take classes, interact with other students, and intern at companies. After four years, participants receive a certificate of completion.

The University of Cincinnati was one of the first universities in the country to be classified by the Carnegie Foundation for the Advancement of Teaching as a Community Engagement focused university and was one of only 35 research universities on this list.

Student organizations
Student Activities & Leadership Development (SALD) oversees over 550 registered student organizations ranging from student government to religious organizations to spirit groups. Housed in the Steger Student Life Center, the divisions overseeing these groups include Club Sports Board, Diversity Education, Greek Life, Leadership Development, Programming, RAPP, Undergraduate Student Government and Graduate Student Government. Other Student Life Offices on campus include the African American Cultural & Resource Center, Bearcat Bands (the largest and oldest student group at UC), Early Learning Center, Ethnic Programs & Services, University Judicial Affairs, Resident Education & Development, Wellness Center, and Women's Center.

Student media
There are several media outlets for university students. The student newspaper, The News Record, has been in production for more than 130 years, taking its current name in 1936. It is an independent, student-run newspaper and not attached to any academic program; therefore any student, regardless of program, is able to apply and work for the newspaper. A student-run radio station named Bearcast is housed in the College-Conservatory of Music on campus. The programming streams online as opposed to a traditional radio station and, like the News Record, is open to any student attending the university. There is also a television station called UCast.

Film festival
The 48-hour film festival is held each year for the general public. The festival has featured guest speakers and filmmakers including Fraser Kershaw, as well as speakers and artists from Kenyatta University in Nairobi, Kenya. Actors, directors, editors, and composers are showcased at the MainStreet Cinema for students and professionals.

Greek life
Fraternities and sororities have been a part of the university since 1840. There are over 2,500 students participating in fraternities and sororities, which represents approximately 11% of the undergraduate population (Uptown Campus). 52 chapters have called UC home over the years, and currently includes 39 social fraternities and sororities: 21 Interfraternity Council fraternities, nine Panhellenic Council sororities, seven National Pan-Hellenic Council (three fraternities and four sororities), and two non-affiliated (Delta Phi Lambda and Phi Sigma Rho organizations.)

Athletics

The university competes in 19 Division I (NCAA) sports, and its athletics teams are known as the "Bearcats". Since July 1, 2013, they have been members of the American Athletic Conference (The American). They were previously members of the Big East Conference, Conference USA (of which they were a founding member), the Great Midwest Conference, the Metro Conference, and the Mid-American Conference, among others.

The university hosts various club sports, some of which are distinguished as Club Varsity. Some include the Bearcat hockey team and the club rowing team, which produced 2000 and 2004 Olympian Kelly Salchow.

Notable Cincinnati Bearcats athletes include Sandy Koufax, Miller Huggins, Oscar Robertson, Jack Twyman, Omar Cummings, Kenyon Martin, Travis Kelce, Jason Kelce, Mary Wineberg and Tony Trabert.

National championships

The university has four individual and six team championships. The Bearcats won the NCAA Men's Division I Basketball Championship in 1961 and 1962, both times against the Ohio State Buckeyes. Charles Keating won the 1946 200-meter butterfly national title for UC as a member of the men's swimming team, and, most recently, Josh Schneider did the same in the  freestyle in 2010. In women's diving, Pat Evans (3 m dive – 1989) and Becky Ruehl (10 m dive – 1996) have brought home titles for the Bearcats. The UC Dance Team has won four National Championships from 2004 through 2006 and again in 2009. They are the first team in UC history to capture three consecutive national titles. They remain one of the top dance programs in the country and are the winningest team in University of Cincinnati history. In 2009 the dance team was also selected to represent the United States in the first world dance championships where they won the gold medal in all three dance categories.

Athletic facilities

All of the athletic facilities (with the exception of Fifth Third Arena and UC Baseball Stadium) are open 24/7 for student use.
 Richard E. Lindner Varsity Village
 Commissioned as part of UC's entrance into the Big East and serves as the centerpiece of UC's athletic facilities. It opened in 2006 and includes the Richard E. Lindner Center, which provides training, meeting, studying, and classroom space, as well as the George and Helen Smith Athletics Museum. Construction of the Varsity Village project included Gettler Stadium (soccer), Trabert-Talbert Tennis Center, Baseball Stadium (eventually named UC Baseball Stadium), and an open athletic field for student use called Sheakley Lawn.
 UC Baseball Stadium 
 Home to the Cincinnati Bearcats baseball team. It replaced Johnny Bench Field. Shortly after this facility opened in 2006, it was named by Big East coaches and players as the best baseball facility in the conference.
 Armory Fieldhouse
 Home of UC indoor track and field teams and former home of the men's and women's basketball teams
 Fifth Third Arena
 Home to UC men's and women's basketball as well as volleyball teams
 Nippert Stadium
 Home to UC's football team (sometimes used for women's lacrosse)
 Ben and Dee Gettler Stadium
 Home to UC women's soccer and men's and women's track and field teams
 Trabert-Talbert Tennis Center
 Home to UC women's tennis team
 Keating Aquatics Center
 Home to UC men's and women's swimming and diving teams
 Sheakley Athletics Center
 New facility constructed in 2010 that provides one full and one half football field for varsity teams to practice on, and the home facility for the women's lacrosse team. From November to February a temporary bubble is inflated over the facility to provide teams practice space during cold months.  The university of planning to renovate the facility and turn the facility into an indoor practice facility and an athlete performance center

Controversies

Culture
In the wake of the George Floyd protests in 2020, a list of demands related to racial equity at the University of Cincinnati were sent to administrators by the Black Round Table and the UC Student Government. Demands included hiring of more Black faculty, making the UC Police Department budget public, making Election Day and Juneteenth university holidays, and removing Charles McMicken's name across campus, as McMicken was a slave owner. In 2022, the university removed McMicken's name from campus.

It was noted in at least one case that these demands were "very similar to those authored by the Irate 8 in 2015". The Irate 8, named after the percentage of Black UC students at the time, was formed following the shooting of Samuel Dubose by members of the UCPD in 2015. In 2019, 7% of students at the University of Cincinnati identified themselves as Black or African American. In comparison, the United States Census Bureau estimates that 42.3% of Cincinnati residents are Black or African American.

Police and Security

In 2010, Kelly Brinson died after being tased and restrained by UCPD inside of the University Hospital. A lawsuit against the hospital was settled in August 2012.

One year after Brinson's death, UC student Everette Howard died after being tased by a UC campus police officer outside of a student dorm. Reports had shown that Howard was previously tased by UC police in 2009. During that incident, he had been disoriented due to dropping "weight for the wrestling team and became sick at school". Following Howard's death, the UCPD pulled tasers from service until further notice.

In July 2015, UC police officer Ray Tensing shot and killed an unarmed Black man, Samuel DuBose. Three years later, Tensing was paid almost $350,000 by the University of Cincinnati, settling a grievance the Ohio police union had filed on behalf of Tensing.

Sports 

In 2020, Former Cincinnati Reds owner and alumna Marge Schott's name was removed from the name of the UC Baseball Stadium, following a unanimous vote by the university's board of trustees. The vote was in response to a petition by former UC baseball player Jordan Ramey which garnered nearly 10,000 signatures.

Notable alumni and faculty members

Notes

References

External links

Cincinnati Athletics website
FBI files on the University of Cincinnati, hosted at the Internet Archive:
Part 1
Part 2

 
American Athletic Conference schools
Educational institutions established in 1819
Greater Cincinnati Consortium of Colleges and Universities
Universities and colleges in Cincinnati
1819 establishments in Ohio